Giorge Díaz Loren (born September 16, 1970) is a Cuban baseball player and Olympic gold medalist. Díaz is a one-time gold medalist for baseball, winning at the 1992 Summer Olympics.

External links

1970 births
Living people
Olympic baseball players of Cuba
Baseball players at the 1992 Summer Olympics
Olympic gold medalists for Cuba
Olympic medalists in baseball
Medalists at the 1992 Summer Olympics